is a collective term for the highest-ranking courtesans in Japanese history, who were considered to be above common prostitutes (known as ) for their more refined entertainment skills and training in the traditional arts.

The term  originated in Yoshiwara, the red light district of Edo in the 1750s, and is applied to all ranks of high level courtesans in historical Japan.

The popularity and numbers of  continued to decline steadily throughout the 19th century, before prostitution was outlawed in Japan in 1957. However, the  remaining in Kyoto's Shimabara district were allowed to continue practising the cultural and performing arts traditions of their profession, and were declared a "special variety" of geisha.

Etymology
The word  comes from the Japanese phrase  which translates loosely to "the lass at our (my) place." When written in kanji, the word consists of two characters: , meaning "flower", and  meaning "leader" or "first."

Traditions

Traditional arts
Clients expected  to be well read, able to converse and write with wit and elegance, and able to match them in intellect in conversation.

Names
An , unlike geisha or common prostitutes, could be promoted or demoted by the owner of her brothel, and commonly inherited a  upon gaining promotion to a higher rank; these names, exclusively the property of the brothel owner, typically carried the prestige of the person who held it previously, and brothel owners commonly chose only those of similar countenance and reputation to inherit them.  were written in kanji, and were typically more elaborate than the average woman's name of the time, holding meanings taken from poetry, literary history and nature;  were rarely passed from one  directly down to their apprentice.

 not considered to be high ranking or skilled enough to hold an inherited name would instead use a professional name considered elegant enough to be the name of a courtesan; these were typically pseudonyms taken to either protect one's identity or to promote the brothel's image, and were likely to be slightly more elaborate than the average woman's name.

Appearance

These  featured elaborate, traditional and auspicious designs, such as dragons, butterflies, arabesque rondels, pine, plum and bamboo, woven and embroidered in heavy gold and silver thread.

The ensemble was belted with an  tied at the front.

Ranks
Unlike courtesans of a lower status,  had sufficient prestige to refuse clients, and did not engage in sex work as a rule, unlike courtesans of lower rank. Their high status also 
made the services of  extremely pricey – a 's fee for one evening was between one  and one , three , well beyond a labourer's monthly wage and comparable to a shop assistant's annual salary.

Though many courtesans could be registered in one area, extremely few reached  status; a guidebook published in 1688 listed the contemporary numbers of high-ranking courtesans in comparison to all the courtesans listed in one area:

 13  were registered in Shimabara out of 329 registered courtesans
 7  were registered in Shinmachi out of 983 registered courtesans
 3  were registered in Osaka and Yoshiwara out of 2,790 registered courtesans

The word  therefore appeared in Yoshiwara as a polite term of address for any remaining woman of courtesan rank.

History

Rise to prominence
These quarters were often placed at some distance from the centre of the attached town or city, and the legal status and location of these districts changed on a number of occasions throughout the following centuries; on occasion, some were closed and their inhabitants either sent to live or work in another, larger red light district.

The three best-known districts historically were Shimabara in Kyoto (which also housed geisha until the 1970s), Shinmachi in Osaka and Yoshiwara in Edo (present day Tokyo). Over time, these districts rapidly grew into large and self contained neighbourhoods, containing a number of different forms of entertainment outside of prostitution including performances and festivals. Geisha – whose profession came into existence in the late 18th century – also occasionally worked within these districts, as edicts passed at various times restricted them from working outside of officially designated red light areas. 

Scholar Jonathan Clements emphasised the striking presence of the  outside of their quarters, where a parading 's slow movements, brightly-coloured and layered clothing, and lacquered hair provided a source of titillation for "the implications of Edo life [to be] so devoid of women." As a larger than life figure, historical accounts of the oiran recall the transferral of respectable house names as tangible products for potential clients, as well as signifiers of rank for established providers. This resulted in a widespread desire for anonymity for the mostly male population within Yoshiwara. Specialized products, such as  hats, medicinal intervention, and the newly developed medium of kabuki encompassed the centricity of the red-light district economy, while also supporting anonymity of its patrons. Thus, the mythical persona for the  did not only extend to physical interactions with her, but embodied one's journey through Yoshiwara itself. Outside of prostitution and the arts, the aesthetic reverence utilised to distinguish different classes of the  became a vehicle for other means of aesthetic expression.

This had a profound impact on the economy, while also reflecting a point of contention between the upper and lower classes of Edo. Yoshiwara, known as "the place without night", represented one of the new places in which "high" culture was able to mingle with that of the lower classes, forging a new aesthetic environment within Edo society alongside their mingling. Another nickname for the Yoshiwara was "ukiyo", a Buddhist word that meant suffering world, which, when written in new characters, came to mean "floating world". This would also later influence the creation of ukiyo-e woodblock prints. Laura W. Allen, the curator of Japanese art at the Asian Art Museum describes the aesthetic intervention as "ignoring the problems that might have existed in a very strictly regulated society and abandoning yourself, bobbing along on the current of pleasure."

Decline
Because of their isolation, the rigidity of their contracts as courtesans – which often ran for 10–15 years before ending their involvement with the profession – and their inability to leave the pleasure districts,  became steadily more traditional, outdated and ritualised, further and further removed from popular society and bound by their strict rules of etiquette, behaviour and speech. This, combined with their relative financial inaccessibility to most people, created a vacuum of entertainment for the rising merchant classes, whose relatively high wealth and relatively low social status left them unable to hire , thus leading to the decision to patronise the greatly more accessible and less expensive geisha instead.

Over time,  also lost their celebrity status in wider society, and came in part to be seen less as highly cultured courtesans reflecting formal, high class standards of speech and appearance, and more as caged women unable to leave the pleasure districts and chained to the debts they owed to their brothel.

Similarly, the entertainment that  offered had mostly remained unchanged since generations of courtesans previous. This was in contrast to the  favoured and sung by geisha, whose lyrical content was often heartfelt and honest.

Competition with geisha
In the years that  declined, the geisha profession was born and grew increasingly stronger, contributing in part, if not in majority, to this decline.

Geisha were, officially-speaking, considered to be a relatively low-class form of entertainment, and as such, were not patronised by the upper classes, who were officially supposed to patronise  instead; however, during the Edo period, geisha came to represent the tastes of the merchant classes, whose low social status and high financial freedom left them free of social obligations to uphold the status of a samurai family that men of the upper classes were commonly beholden to.

As the merchant classes throughout Edo-period society grew in wealth and profligacy, they became the main source of income for geisha, who represented social and financial accessibility in a way that  did not. Geisha were cheap to patronise, informal to converse with, required few introductions before entertaining a customer and both played and sang the most popular songs of the time. Through various dress edicts aimed at controlling the merchant classes and thus preserving the appearances and social status of the upper classes, extravagant or obvious displays of wealth had been outlawed and driven underground, bringing aesthetics such as  into popularity, which geisha came to both represent and champion. A geisha's loyalties were also held to be more true, as geisha could choose whom they wished to entertain, and geisha became the subject of many popular romantic stories.

Though geisha also worked within the pleasure districts that  did – at times forbidden to work outside of them – as the profession developed, laws regarding the separation of the two professions were passed. Geisha were registered at a separate registry office, and if an  accused a geisha of stealing a customer, she would be fully investigated, with the potential to be forbidden from working if found guilty.

Though many geisha went into debt or held at least some debt with their , few found themselves in the same situation of financial domination and ownership that  were almost entirely bound to.

Later years (1850–1957)
Towards the end of the Edo period,  continued to dwindle in popularity as the geisha grew in numbers, accessibility, and appeal. By the beginning of the Meiji period, official attitudes towards legalized prostitution within Japan had changed owing to the country's increasing international presence. Towards the end of the 19th century, geisha had replaced  as the entertainer and companion of choice for the wealthiest in Japanese society, with the central appeal of  having grown increasingly remote from everyday life.

 continued to see clients within the old pleasure quarters, but were no longer at the cutting edge of fashion, and during the years of World War II, when any show of luxury was heavily clamped down upon, the culture surrounding  suffered even further, being dealt the final blow in 1957 by the Anti-Prostitution Law – after which the profession of courtesan (excluding the performance arts of ) became illegal.

Modern  and

continue to entertain in a similar manner to geisha, with fewer than five  left in modern-day Kyoto.

The  is an annual event held every April in Bunsui, Niigata Prefecture (now part of the city of Tsubame). The parade, which takes place in spring, historically re-enacts the walk made by top courtesans around their district in honour of their guests. The , who are named Shinano, Sakura, and Bunsui, walk with the distinctive slow gait of wearing .

The Ōsu Street Performers' Festival is an event held around Ōsu Kannon Temple in Nagoya yearly around the beginning of October. The highlight of this two-day festival is the slow procession of  through the Ōsu Kannon shopping arcade.

An  parade is held in the Minamishinagawa district near Aomono-Yokochō, Shinagawa every September.

See also
 Geisha
 
 Prostitution in Japan
 Sing-song girls
 Tawaif

Notes

References

Further reading

External links 

Tokyo Ichiyo Sakura Festival Edo Yoshiwara Oiran Parade
Yoshino Tayu Hana Kuyo. 2008.
Tayu no Dochu
Niigata Prefecture Bunsui Sakura Festival Oiran Parade

Social history of Japan
 Oiran
 Oiran
Courtesans by type
Gendered occupations
Japanese culture
Society of Japan
Sexuality in Japan
Prostitution in Japan
Japanese words and phrases